Nordens Frihet (Swedish: Nordic Freedom) was a Swedish language anti-Nazi weekly magazine that was published by Samfundet Nordens Frihet, an association established to support the independence of the Nordic countries. The magazine existed between March 1940 and December 1945.

History and profile
Nordens Frihet was started by an association, Samfundet Nordens Frihet, on 28 March 1940. The editorial board consisted of ten individuals, including historian Nils Ahnlund and writer Eyvind Johnson, who were all members of the association. Its editor was Harald Wigforss.

The magazine was published on a weekly basis until April 1944 when its frequency was switched to monthly. It had an anti-Fascist political stance and encouraged the independence of the Nordic countries during World War II. Following the invasion of Denmark and Norway by the Nazi forces in April 1940 it called for the formation of a defensive alliance by Sweden and Finland. The magazine was also against Soviet Union's policies of invasion.

Nordens Frihet ceased publication in December 1945.

References

1940 establishments in Sweden
1945 disestablishments in Sweden
Anti-fascism in Sweden
Defunct magazines published in Sweden
Defunct political magazines
Magazines established in 1940
Magazines disestablished in 1945
Monthly magazines published in Sweden
Political magazines published in Sweden
Swedish-language magazines
Weekly magazines published in Sweden